Lindsay Kellock (born April 22, 1990) is a Canadian Equestrian Team athlete in dressage. She is reigning Pan American Games champion in team dressage, when she won gold in 2019 in Lima with Jill Irving, Tina Irwin, and Naïma Moreira-Laliberté. Kellock was born in Toronto and grew up in Newmarket, Ontario, but currently resides in New York.

Kellock represented Canada at the 2020 Olympic Games in Tokyo with her horse Sebastien. She finished 50th in the individual competition.

References

1990 births
Canadian female equestrians
Canadian dressage riders
Living people
Equestrians at the 2019 Pan American Games
Equestrians at the 2020 Summer Olympics
Olympic equestrians of Canada
Sportspeople from Toronto
Pan American Games gold medalists for Canada
Pan American Games medalists in equestrian
Medalists at the 2019 Pan American Games
20th-century Canadian women
21st-century Canadian women